The following events occurred in April 1924:

April 1, 1924 (Tuesday)
The verdicts in the Beer Hall Putsch trial were announced. Adolf Hitler, Ernst Pöhner, Hermann Kriebel and Friedrich Weber were all found guilty of treason and sentenced to five years in prison, with a chance of parole in six months. Erich Ludendorff was acquitted. 
Hitler was taken to Landsberg Prison and given a large and comfortable room with a fine view.
The Royal Canadian Air Force was activated.
Born: Brendan Byrne, politician, in West Orange, New Jersey (d. 2018)
Died: Frank Capone, 28, Chicago mobster and older brother of Al Capone (shot by police)

April 2, 1924 (Wednesday)
A huge monarchist demonstration was staged in Berlin on the occasion of the funeral for martyred criminal Wilhelm Dreyer, a German who died in a French prison after dynamiting a train in the Ruhr. Police struggled to prevent an unauthorized parade from forming in the wake of Dreyer's casket procession.
The Italian government announced it was studying measures to take against Romania over its failure to pay its debts to Italy.
Born: Bobby Ávila, baseball player, in Veracruz, Mexico (d. 2004)

April 3, 1924 (Thursday)
The Mussolini government demanded 80 million gold lire from Romania to square its debts within several days, stationing several Italian warships off the port of Constanța to back up the ultimatum.
In Chicago, twenty-four-year-old Beulah Annan shot the man she'd been having an affair with in her apartment. 
Born: Marlon Brando, actor, in Omaha, Nebraska (d. 2004); Errol Brathwaite, author, in Waipukurau, New Zealand (d. 2005); Josephine Pullein-Thompson, British author (d. 2014)

April 4, 1924 (Friday)
An extravagant funeral for slain mobster Frank Capone was held in Chicago.
BBC School Radio, aimed at primary schools, first aired.
Born: Gil Hodges, baseball player, in Princeton, Indiana (d. 1972)

April 5, 1924 (Saturday)
University of Cambridge won the 76th annual Boat Race along the River Thames.

April 6, 1924 (Sunday)
A general election was held in Italy. The National List (a coalition headed by National Fascist Party leader Benito Mussolini) received 60% of the votes and two-thirds of the seats in Parliament in accordance with the Acerbo Law. 
In Seattle, Washington, a team of aviators with four specially built airplanes began their quest to be the first to fly all the way around the world. Lowell Smith was one of the pilots.
Born: Jimmy Roberts, singer, in Madisonville, Kentucky (d. 1999)

April 7, 1924 (Monday)
Ramsay MacDonald's Labour government suffered its first parliamentary defeat when it failed to pass a bill introduced by John Wheatley that would have protected unemployed people from being evicted over inability to pay rent.
Born: Johannes Mario Simmel, writer, in Vienna, Austria (d. 2009)

April 8, 1924 (Tuesday)
France delivered thirteen tons of gold ingots to English officers in the port city of Calais. The export of gold reserves was part of France's efforts to stabilize the franc.

April 9, 1924 (Wednesday)
The committee headed by Charles G. Dawes submitted its plan to reorganize the German economy and restructure its reparations payments.
Born: Milburn G. Apt, test pilot, in Buffalo, Kansas (d. 1956)

April 10, 1924 (Thursday)
King Ferdinand and Queen Marie of Romania arrived in Paris on a royal visit. Though officially only a friendly visit, it was widely believed that Romania was seeking an alliance with France due to unfriendly relations with Russia, Spain and Italy.
The Dawes Plan committee urged all nations concerned to enact the plan quickly before conditions in Germany changed.
Died: Hugo Stinnes, 54, German industrialist and politician

April 11, 1924 (Friday)
The German Association of Industry released a statement expressing approval of the Dawes Plan.
Folketing elections were held in Denmark. The Social Democratic Party led by Thorvald Stauning won a plurality of seats.
4,000 Germans used the occasion of a concert to stage a pro-monarchist demonstration in Breslau for ex-Crown Prince Wilhelm and Princess Cecilie.
Sigma Phi Delta Fraternity was founded.

April 12, 1924 (Saturday)
The Federação Catarinense de Futebol was founded in Brazil.
Charles G. Dawes visited Rome and met with Benito Mussolini, who expressed his support for the reparations plan.
Born: Raymond Barre, politician, in Saint-Denis, Réunion, France (d. 2007)

April 13, 1924 (Sunday)
A referendum on becoming a republic was held in Greece. 70% voted in favor.
Born: Jack T. Chick, fundamentalist Christian author and publisher, in Boyle Heights, Los Angeles (d. 2016)

April 14, 1924 (Monday)
Britain and the Soviet Union opened a conference in London seeking to re-establish relations and settle the status of British private property that was seized by the Communists after the Revolution.
The Roy Crane comic strip Wash Tubbs first ran.
Born: Philip Stone, actor, in Leeds, England (d. 2003)
Died: Louis Sullivan, 67, American architect

April 15, 1924 (Tuesday)
The Japan Times called for a boycott of California if the United States passed the Immigration Act, putting the blame for the bill on that state.
Born: Rikki Fulton, actor and comedian, in Glasgow, Scotland (d. 2004); and Neville Marriner, conductor and violinist, in Lincoln, England (d. 2016)

April 16, 1924 (Wednesday)
The German government accepted the Dawes Plan.
Romania announced it had settled its debts with Italy.
Born: Henry Mancini, composer and arranger, in Cleveland, Ohio (d. 1994)

April 17, 1924 (Thursday)
Metro Pictures, Goldwyn Pictures Corporation and Louis B. Mayer Pictures merged. For a time, films were released as "A Metro-Goldwyn Picture, Produced by Louis B. Mayer" before the film company billed itself as Metro-Goldwyn-Mayer.
Japanese businesses began canceling orders from the United States in protest against the immigration bill.

April 18, 1924 (Friday)
A new company called Simon & Schuster released the first book of crossword puzzles ever published.
Born: Clarence "Gatemouth" Brown, musician, in Vinton, Louisiana (d. 2005); Henry Hyde, politician, in Chicago (d. 2007)

April 19, 1924 (Saturday)
Telefónica, a Spanish telecommunication 
 business founded, as predecessor name was Campañía Telefónica Nacional de España.
The National Barn Dance was first broadcast on WLS in Chicago.
Died: Paul Boyton, 75, American showman

April 20, 1924 (Sunday)
The drama film Triumph, directed by Cecil B. DeMille, was released.
The Turkish Constitution was ratified.
The Franz Kafka short story A Little Woman was first published in the German-language Czech newspaper Prager Tagblatt.
Born: Nina Foch, actress, in Leiden, Netherlands (d. 2008); Leslie Phillips, actor, in Tottenham, England (alive in 2021)

April 21, 1924 (Monday)
The Japan Printing Association voted to place a boycott on all goods from California.
The Buster Keaton comedy film Sherlock Jr. was released.
Died: Eleonora Duse, 65, Italian actress

April 22, 1924 (Tuesday)
In a luncheon address to the Associated Press in New York, U.S. President Calvin Coolidge proposed an international disarmament conference along the lines of the one that produced the Washington Naval Treaty.
Died: Avni Rustemi, 28, Albanian activist and nationalist figure (assassinated by an agent of Ahmet Zogu)

April 23, 1924 (Wednesday)
The British Empire Exhibition opened at Wembley. King George V opened the exhibition by sending a telegram that passed through Canada, New Zealand, Australia, South Africa, India, Aden, Egypt, Gibraltar and back to London in 1 minute and 20 seconds.
Indian spiritual teacher Meher Baba designed the flag that bears his name.
Born: Bobby Rosengarden, jazz drummer, in Elgin, Illinois (d. 2007)

April 24, 1924 (Thursday)
Thorvald Stauning became Prime Minister of Denmark.
Born: Clement Freud, broadcaster, radio personality and politician, in Berlin, Germany (d. 2009); Clive King, writer, in Richmond, Surrey, England (d. 2018); and Nahuel Moreno, Argentine Trotskyist leader (d. 1987)

April 25, 1924 (Friday)
The Belgian government accepted the Dawes Plan.
Died: Charles Francis Murphy, 65, American politician

April 26, 1924 (Saturday)
Part 2 of the Fritz Lang fantasy film Die Nibelungen premiered at the Ufa-Palast am Zoo in Berlin.
Newcastle United beat Aston Villa 2–0 to win the 1924 FA Cup.

April 27, 1924 (Sunday)
Germany's government issued a proclamation warning the German people against extremists who opposed the Dawes Plan, saying that it was the only way to save the country, and its rejection might lead to a crisis that would cause another world war.

April 28, 1924 (Monday)
The Benwood Mine Disaster occurred in Benwood, West Virginia. An explosion claimed the lives of 119 miners.
Born: Kenneth Kaunda, 1st President of Zambia, in Chinsali, Northern Rhodesia (d. 2021)

April 29, 1924 (Tuesday)
Chancellor of the Exchequer Philip Snowden presented the Labour government's first budget.
Southern Rhodesia held a general election; the Rhodesia Party won 26 of 30 seats.
Born: Al Balding, golfer, in Toronto, Canada (d. 2006)

April 30, 1924 (Wednesday)
An outbreak of tornados killed over 110 people across the Southern United States.
Over 10,000 people attended the funeral of slain Albanian nationalist figure Avni Rustemi in Vlorë. Bishop Fan Noli gave a fiery speech which emboldened opposition against the government and led to the June Revolution.
An armed revolt broke out in Cienfuegos, Cuba.
Air service was inaugurated between Liverpool and Belfast.
The lead plane in the round-the-world flight attempt, Seattle, crashed in a dense fog near Port Moller, Alaska. The crew was rescued but declared they would never again fly in a plane made of lead.

References

1924
1924-04
1924-04